Charles Samuel Deneen (May 4, 1863 – February 5, 1940) was an American lawyer and Republican politician who served as the 23rd Governor of Illinois, from 1905 to 1913. He was the first Illinois governor to serve two consecutive terms totalling eight years. He was governor during the infamous Springfield race riot of 1908, which he helped put down. He later served as a U.S. Senator from Illinois, from 1925 to 1931. Deneen had previously served as a member of the Illinois House of Representatives from 1892 to 1894. As an attorney, he had been the lead prosecutor in Chicago's infamous Adolph Luetgert murder trial.

Life and career
Deneen was born in Edwardsville, Illinois, to Samuel H. Deneen and Mary Frances Ashley. He was raised in Lebanon, Illinois, and graduated from McKendree College in Lebanon in 1882.  He subsequently studied law at McKendree and at Union College of Law, while supporting himself by teaching school. He was admitted to the Illinois bar in 1886. On May 10, 1891, he married fellow Methodist Bina Day Maloney in Princeton, Illinois. The couple had four children; Charles Ashley, Dorothy, Frances, and Bina.

His political career began soon thereafter, with election to the Illinois House of Representatives in 1892. Deneen was Cook County State's Attorney from 1896 to 1904. In 1896, Deneen appointed Ferdinand Lee Barnett as the first black assistant state's attorney in Illinois upon the recommendation of the Cook County Commissioner Edward H. Wright. Deneen and Barnett worked together closely for the next two decades.

Deneen became Governor of Illinois in 1905 and supported passage of the Illinois anti-lynching law that year. The state had not had many instances of lynchings, but in 1909 William "Froggie" James was murdered in a spectacle lynching attended by a mob of 10,000 in Cairo, Illinois. The crowd also lynched Henry Salzner, a white man, who had allegedly killed his wife. The governor sent in National Guard troops to suppress violence. Under the 1905 state law, Deneen dismissed Sheriff Frank E. Davis for failing to protect James and Salzner and resisted local efforts to have the officer reinstated.

In 1924, Deneen defeated first-term Senator Medill McCormick in the Republican primary for the United States Senate. Illinois at that time customarily had a downstate seat and a Chicago-area seat, which McCormick held. McCormick committed suicide in early 1925, for which his widow Ruth Hanna McCormick (a future U.S. Representative) blamed Deneen. She defeated him in the 1930 Republican primary, but lost the November election to James Hamilton Lewis. In 1928 Deneen's home was bombed during an outbreak of violence among rival political factions in Chicago in advance of the Pineapple Primary election.

Deneen died in Chicago on February 5, 1940, and was interred there in the Oak Woods Cemetery. The public Deneen School of Excellence was named in his honor. It is located in south Chicago next to the Dan Ryan Expressway, not far from Al Capone's former home on South Prairie.

Deneen's great-grandson is actor Jason Beghe.<ref name="Redeye">{{cite news |last=Wagner |first=Curt |title=Chicago P.D.' cast members feel at home' |url=http://articles.redeyechicago.com/2014-01-08/entertainment/46073537_1_chicago-fire-antonio-dawson-dick-wolf |work=Redeye |date=January 8, 2014 |access-date=February 12, 2016 |archive-date=August 16, 2014 |archive-url=https://web.archive.org/web/20140816085158/http://articles.redeyechicago.com/2014-01-08/entertainment/46073537_1_chicago-fire-antonio-dawson-dick-wolf |url-status=live }}</ref>

References

Further reading

 Fullinwider, James William. "The Governor and the Senator: Executive Power and the Structure of the Illinois Republican Party, 1880-1917." (Washington University in St. Louis ProQuest Dissertations Publishing,  1974. 7514897).
 Pegram, Thomas R. Partisans and Progressives: Private Interest and Public Policy in Illinois, 1870-1922 (University of Illinois Press, 1992), extensive coverage of Deneen.
 Tingley, Donald F.  The Structuring of a State: The History of Illinois, 1899 to 1928'' (1980)

External links
 

1863 births
1940 deaths
American prosecutors
People from Edwardsville, Illinois
Republican Party governors of Illinois
Republican Party United States senators from Illinois
Republican Party members of the Illinois House of Representatives
Northwestern University Pritzker School of Law alumni
McKendree University alumni
Illinois lawyers
People from Lebanon, Illinois